The Thames Cable Tunnel, also known as the Tilbury – Gravesend Cable Tunnel, is a tunnel carrying high-voltage electrical transmission lines beneath the lower River Thames between Tilbury and Gravesend. It remains the furthest tunnel downstream on the Thames.

Completed in 1970 at a cost of around £3 million (equivalent to £ million in ) by the Central Electricity Generating Board, the tunnel carries 400 kV transmission cables between substations at Tilbury and Kingsnorth as part of the National Grid. A tunnel was chosen due to the high costs of building an overhead transmission line at this point in the river.

See also 
 400 kV Thames Crossing
 Dartford Cable Tunnel

References 

Tunnels in London
Electric power infrastructure in England
Electric power transmission in the United Kingdom
Tunnels underneath the River Thames